This is a list of train stations and Thruway Motorcoach stops used by Amtrak (the National Railroad Passenger Corporation in the United States). This list is in alphabetical order by station or stop name, which mostly corresponds to the city in which it is located. If an English Wikipedia page exists for the actual station or stop, a link is included. Some Thruway Motorcoach stops include train stations that are not served by Amtrak trains (and occasionally any trains at all).

All current (and most former) Amtrak train stops (stations) and Thruway Motorcoach stops have a three-letter station code (sometimes also referred to as a city code). These codes do not necessarily correspond with the list of IATA-indexed train stations or the three-character IATA airport codes, although many are the same. Amtrak began using station codes in 1992, so stations closed or removed from all Amtrak service prior to 1992 have no assigned station code. The station code "ENP" is used for "any stop en route, not otherwise specified". If a station code was used by more than one train station, each station is listed. However, if a station code was used for a Thruway Motorcoach stop that has changed locations, only information for the current location (or most recent location, if the stop is no longer in service) is included in the notes, unless one of the locations was an actual train station.

Ridership data and station ownership is from Amtrak's Great American Stations website. The ownership of many stations is shared, with one entity owning one or more of the following: the facility itself, the parking lot, the passenger platform, and the train tracks. In some instances, the owner of the bus station used for a Thruway Motorcoach stop is not the same as the connection service provider.

Many stations do not offer full services (ticketing, baggage, etc.). Some stations and Thruway Motorcoach stops are conditional or flag stops, with trains only stopping at the station if reservations for a pickup or drop off are made in advance. Some stations are seasonal with trains or buses stopping only during certain times of the year.

Although Amtrak operations are almost exclusively limited to the United States, there are three exceptions (all of which are in Canada). The first exception includes the six northwesternmost stations (in Ontario) served by the Maple Leaf. (The Maple Leaf is a joint operation between Amtrak and Via Rail Canada. The International Limited was also a joint Via Rail Canada/Amtrak operation before it was discontinued in 2004.) The second exception includes the two northernmost stations (in Quebec) served by the Adirondack and the northernmost station (in British Columbia) served by the Amtrak Cascades. (Both the Adirondack and the Amtrak Cascades are exclusively Amtrak operations.) Each of the aforementioned train stations are identified as a Canadian railway station. The third exception includes the eight Thruway Motorcoach stops in British Columbia.

Among the Amtrak stations are several "tour only" stations which require special reservations with Amtrak for a group (usually twenty or more persons) for the train to stop at that station (such stations include  and Marceline stations). There are also several "stations" (many of which are not actually train stations at all) which only operate in conjunction with regular special events (such "stations"/events include the Lexington Barbecue Festival, the New York State Fair, and the North Carolina State Fair) and others that are unique to a specific event (for example, the Secaucus Junction station which only was an Amtrak stop for Super Bowl XLVIII).

Active stations

Suspended stations

Closed stations

Future stations

Thruway Motorcoach stations

See also
 List of busiest Amtrak stations
 List of Amtrak stations in California
 List of IATA-indexed train stations
 List of major cities in U.S. lacking Amtrak service
 List of Greyhound Bus stations
 List of closed Amtrak stations

Notes

Bibliography

References

Sources
 General list of stations on Amtrak's website
 Amtrak fact sheets, FY 2006
 Amtrak Winter-Spring 2014 Timetable
 Amtrak's Great American Station website
 List of Amtrak stations (with addresses) on trainweb.org
 Pictures of Amtrak Stations on trainweb.org
 The Museum of Railway Timetables

External links
 Collection of Google Earth locations of Amtrak rail stations and bus stops (Requires Google Earth software) from the Google Earth Community forum.

Amtrak stations
Lists of railway stations in the United States
United States railway-related lists
Location codes